Eisenfunk was a German Electronic body music (EBM) band.

History 
The band was founded by Michael Mayer in early 2006. They published its first EP, Funkferngesteuert later that year. In 2007, Arthur Stauder and Toni Schulz joined the group. That same year the band released their first CD, the eponymous Eisenfunk, and began playing live shows. 

In July 2012, the band played at the Amphi Festival in Cologne, Germany.

In May 2014 the band announced the end of the Eisenfunk project. Eisenfunk's last official concert took place on 17 May 2014, in Ingolstadt, Germany. Despite this, their music is still played online, and is still gaining popularity amongst new cybergoths.

Discography 

Funkferngesteuert (EP, 2006)
Eisenfunk (2007)
300 (EP, 2008)
Schmerzfrequenz (2009)
8 Bit (2010)
Pentafunk (2011)

References

External links 

 Eisenfunk Discography

Musical groups established in 2006
German industrial music groups
German electronic music groups